Conasprella boucheti is a species of sea snail, a marine gastropod mollusk in the family Conidae, the cone snails and their allies.

Like all species within the genus Conasprella, these snails are predatory and venomous. They are capable of "stinging" humans, therefore live ones should be handled carefully or not at all.

Description
The size of the shell varies between 14 mm and 39 mm.

Distribution
This marine species occurs off New Caledonia.

References

 Richard, G., 1983. Two new species of Conus from New Caledonia: Conus boucheti sp. nov. and Conus kanakinus sp. nov. (Neogastropoda: Conidae). Journal of the Malacological Society of Australia 6(1–2): 53–58
 Tucker J.K. & Tenorio M.J. (2009) Systematic classification of Recent and fossil conoidean gastropods. Hackenheim: Conchbooks. 296 pp.
  Puillandre N., Duda T.F., Meyer C., Olivera B.M. & Bouchet P. (2015). One, four or 100 genera? A new classification of the cone snails. Journal of Molluscan Studies. 81: 1–23

External links
 The Conus Biodiversity website
 
 Holotype at MNHN, Paris

boucheti
Gastropods described in 1983